Flavius Senator (floruit 436–449) was a politician of the Eastern Roman Empire.

Biography 

Senator was appointed consul posterior in the year 436 AD, with Anthemius Isidorus as consul prior. According to Priscus, he was sent by Eastern Roman Emperor Theodosius II as an envoy to the King of the Huns, Attila in 442/443. In 449, Attila stated that he would accept as envoy only Senator, Anatolius and Nomus, all of consular rank.

He received the title patricius before 445–447. He was a recipient of Theodoret's letter requesting tax reduction on his city in 445–447. In 451, he was present during some sessions of the Council of Chalcedon, which is his last action to be reliably recorded in the sources.

He founded Church of Archangel Michael in Constantinople, which may have been small in scale. The building was torn down in the 6th century for Justinian I to rebuild it.

References

Bibliography 

 Arnold Hugh Martin Jones, John Robert Martindale, John Morris, "Fl. Senator 4", Prosopography of the Later Roman Empire, Cambridge University Press, 1971, pp. 990–991.

5th-century Romans
5th-century Roman consuls
Ancient Roman diplomats
Imperial Roman consuls
5th-century diplomats